Surcouf was a large French gun-armed cruiser submarine of the mid 20th century. She carried two 8" guns as well as anti-aircraft guns and (for most of her career) a floatplane. Surcouf served in the French Navy and, later, the Free French Naval Forces during the Second World War. 

Surcouf disappeared during the night of 18/19 February 1942 in the Caribbean Sea, possibly after colliding with the American freighter Thompson Lykes, although this is not definitely established. She was named after the French privateer and shipowner Robert Surcouf. She was the largest submarine built until surpassed by the first Japanese I-400 class aircraft carrier submarine in 1944.

Design

The Washington Naval Treaty had placed strict limits on naval construction by the major naval powers in regard to displacements and artillery calibers of battleships and cruisers. However, no agreements were reached in respect of light ships such as frigates, destroyers or submarines. In addition, to ensure the country's protection and that of the empire, France mounted the construction of an important submarine fleet (79 units in 1939). Surcouf was intended to be the first of a class of three submarine cruisers; however, she was the only one completed.

The missions revolved around the following:
 Ensure contact with the French colonies;
 In collaboration with French naval squadrons, search and destroy enemy fleets;  
 Pursuit of enemy convoys.

Surcouf had a twin-gun turret with 203 mm (8-inch) guns, the same calibre as the guns of a heavy cruiser, provisioned with 60 rounds. She  was designed as an "underwater heavy cruiser", intended to seek out and engage in surface combat. The boat carried a Besson MB.411 observation floatplane in a hangar built aft of the conning tower for reconnaissance and observing fall of shot.

The boat was equipped with ten torpedo tubes: four  tubes in the bow, and two swiveling external launchers in the aft superstructure, each with one 550mm and two  torpedo tubes. Eight 550mm and four 400mm reloads were carried. The 203mm/50 Modèle 1924 guns were in a pressure-tight turret forward of the conning tower. The guns had a 60-round magazine capacity and were controlled by a director with a  rangefinder, mounted high enough to view an  horizon, and able to fire within three minutes after surfacing.
The Besson observation plane could be used to direct fire out to the guns'  maximum range. Anti-aircraft cannon and machine guns were mounted on the top of the hangar.

Surcouf also carried a  motorboat, and contained a cargo compartment with fittings to restrain 40 prisoners or lodge 40 passengers. The submarine's fuel tanks were very large; enough fuel for a  range and supplies for 90-day patrols could be carried.

The first commanding officer was Frigate Captain (Capitaine de Frégate, a rank equivalent to Commander) Raymond de Belot.

The boat encountered several technical challenges, owing to the 203mm guns.

 The duration between the surface order and the first firing round was 3 minutes and 35 seconds. This duration would be longer if the boat was to fire broadside, which meant surfacing and training the turret in the desired direction.    
 Firing had to occur at a precise moment of pitch and roll when the ship was level.
 Training the turret to either side was impossible when the ship rolled 8° or more.  
 Surcouf could not fire accurately at night, as fall of shot could not be observed in the dark.
 The guns' ready magazines had to be reloaded after firing 14 rounds from each gun.

To replace the floatplane, whose functioning was initially constrained and limited in use, trials were conducted with an autogyro in 1938.

Appearance of Surcouf

Surcouf was never painted in olive green as shown on numerous models and drawings. From the beginning of the boat's career until 1932, the boat was painted the same grey colour as surface warships, but thereafter in Prussian dark blue, a colour which was retained until the end of 1940 when it was repainted with two tones of grey, serving as camouflage on the hull and conning tower.

 Surcouf is often depicted in her 1932 state, displaying the flag of the Free French Naval Forces which was not created until 1940.

Career

Early career

Soon after Surcouf was launched, the London Naval Treaty finally placed restrictions on submarine designs. Among other things, each signatory (France included) was permitted to possess no more than three large submarines, each not exceeding  standard displacement, with guns not exceeding  in caliber. Surcouf, which would have exceeded these limits, was specially exempt from the rules at the insistence of Navy Minister Georges Leygues, but other 'big-gun' submarines of this boat's class could no longer be built.

Second World War

In 1940, Surcouf was based in Cherbourg, but in May, when the Germans invaded, she was being refitted in Brest following a mission in the Antilles and Gulf of Guinea. Under command of Frigate Captain Martin, unable to dive and with only one engine functioning and a jammed rudder, she limped across the English Channel and sought refuge in Plymouth.

On 3 July, the British, concerned that the French Fleet would be taken over by the German Kriegsmarine at the French armistice, executed Operation Catapult. The Royal Navy blockaded the harbours where French warships were anchored, and delivered an ultimatum: rejoin the fight against Germany, be put out of reach of the Germans, or scuttle. Few accepted willingly; the North African fleet at Mers-el-Kebir and the ships based at Dakar (French West Africa) refused.  The French battleships in North Africa were eventually attacked and all but one sunk at their moorings by the Mediterranean Fleet.

Free French Naval Forces
By August 1940, the British completed Surcoufs refit and turned her over to the Free French Naval Forces (Forces Navales Françaises Libres, FNFL) for convoy patrol. The only officer not repatriated from the original crew, Frigate Captain Georges Louis Blaison, became the new commanding officer. Because of Anglo-French tensions with regard to the submarine, accusations were made by each side that the other was spying for Vichy France; the British also claimed Surcouf was attacking British ships. Later, a British officer and two sailors were put aboard for "liaison" purposes. One real drawback was she required a crew of 110–130 men, which represented three crews of more conventional submarines. This led to Royal Navy reluctance to recommission her.

Surcouf then went to the Canadian base at Halifax, Nova Scotia and escorted trans-Atlantic convoys. In April 1941, she was damaged by a German plane at Devonport.

On 28 July, Surcouf went to the United States Naval Shipyard at Kittery, Maine for a three-month refit.

After leaving the shipyard, Surcouf went to New London, Connecticut, perhaps to receive additional training for her crew.  Surcouf left New London on 27 November to return to Halifax.

Capture of St. Pierre and Miquelon
In December 1941, Surcouf carried the Free French Admiral Émile Muselier to Canada, putting into Quebec City. While the Admiral was in Ottawa, conferring with the Canadian government, Surcoufs captain was approached by The New York Times reporter Ira Wolfert and questioned about the rumours the submarine would liberate Saint-Pierre and Miquelon for Free France.

United States Secretary of State Cordell Hull had just concluded an agreement with the Vichy government guaranteeing the neutrality of French possessions in the Western hemisphere, and he threatened to resign unless President of the United States Franklin D. Roosevelt demanded a restoration of the status quo. Roosevelt did so, but when Charles de Gaulle refused, Roosevelt dropped the matter. Ira Wolfert's stories – very favourable to the Free French (and bearing no sign of kidnapping or other duress) – helped swing American popular opinion away from Vichy. The Axis Powers' declaration of war on the United States in December 1941 negated the agreement, but the U.S. did not sever diplomatic ties with the Vichy Government until November 1942.

Later operations
In January 1942, the Free French leadership decided to send Surcouf to the Pacific theatre, after she had been re-supplied at the Royal Naval Dockyard in Bermuda. However, her movement south triggered rumours that Surcouf was going to liberate Martinique from the Vichy regime.

In fact, Surcouf was bound for Sydney, Australia, via Tahiti. She departed Halifax on 2 February for Bermuda, which she left on 12 February, bound for the Panama Canal.

Fate

An American report concluded the disappearance was due to an accidental collision with the American freighter . Steaming alone from Guantanamo Bay on what was a very dark night, the freighter reported hitting and running down a partially submerged object which scraped along her side and keel. Her lookouts heard people in the water but, thinking she had hit a U-boat, the freighter did not stop although cries for help were heard in English. A signal was sent to Panama describing the incident.

The loss resulted in 130 deaths (including 4 Royal Navy personnel), under the command of Frigate Captain Georges Louis Nicolas Blaison. The loss of Surcouf was announced by the Free French Headquarters in London on 18 April 1942, and was reported in The New York Times the next day. It was not reported Surcouf was sunk as the result of a collision with the Thompson Lykes until January 1945.

The investigation of the French commission concluded the disappearance was the consequence of misunderstanding. A Consolidated PBY, patrolling the same waters on the night of 18/19 February, could have attacked Surcouf believing her to be German or Japanese. This theory could have been backed by several elements:

 The witness testimonies of cargo ship SS Thompson Lykes, which accidentally collided with a submarine, described a submarine smaller than Surcouf
 The damage to the Thompson Lykes was too light for a collision with Surcouf
 The position of Surcouf did not correspond to any position of German submarines at that moment
 The Germans did not register any submarine loss in that sector during the war.

Inquiries into the incident were haphazard and late, while a later French inquiry supported the idea that the sinking had been due to "friendly fire"; this conclusion was supported by Rear Admiral Auphan in his book The French Navy in World War II. Charles de Gaulle stated in his memoirs that Surcouf "had sunk with all hands".

Legacy

As no one has officially dived or verified the wreck of Surcouf, its location is unknown.

A monument commemorates the loss in the port of Cherbourg in Normandy, France. The loss is also commemorated by the Free French Memorial on Lyle Hill in Greenock, Scotland.

As there is no conclusive confirmation that Thompson Lykes collided with Surcouf, and her wreck has yet to be discovered, there are alternative stories of her fate. James Rusbridger examined some of these theories in his book Who Sank Surcouf?, finding them all easily dismissed except one: the records of the 6th Heavy Bomber Group operating out of Panama show them sinking a large submarine the morning of 19 February. Since no German submarine was lost in the area on that date, it could have been Surcouf. He suggested the collision had damaged Surcoufs radio and the stricken boat limped towards Panama hoping for the best.

A conspiracy theory, based on no significant evidence, held that the Surcouf, during its stationing at New London in late 1941, had been caught treacherously supplying a German U–boat in Long Island Sound, pursued by the American training subs Marlin and Mackerel out of New London, and sunk. The rumor circulated into the early 21st century, but is false since the Surcoufs later movements south are well documented.

Honors
Médaille de la Résistance avec Rosette (Resistance Medal with rosette) - 29 November 1946
Cited in Orders of Corps of the Army - 4 August 1945
Cited in Orders of the Navy - 8 January 1947

See also
French submarines of World War II
Fusiliers Marins
Georges Cabanier
HM Submarine X1

Japanese I-400-class submarine
List of submarines of France
Submarine aircraft carrier

References

Bibliography

External links

NN3 Specs 
Surcouf and M.B.411
War History Online
 Roll of Honor

Submarines of the French Navy
Submarine aircraft carriers
Ships built in France
1929 ships
World War II submarines of France
Submarines of the Free French Naval Forces
Submarines sunk in collisions
World War II shipwrecks in the Caribbean Sea
International maritime incidents
Maritime incidents in the United Kingdom
Maritime incidents in July 1940
Maritime incidents in February 1942
Warships lost with all hands
Surface-underwater ships
Lost submarines of France